Margarita Balliana (fl. 1680) was a Renaissance woman of letters from Casale Monferrato in north-west Italy. She received a good education in philosophy and history and was described by Gioseffantonio Morano as ‘illustrious for the fineness of her talents’. She published various poems in Latin and in Italian and was praised by Stefano Guazzo, the most prominent writer of Renaissance Casale, and by Fulgenzio Alghisi, the historian of Monferrato. She married Federico Prato, a senator of Monferrato.

See also
Margarita Bobba and Camilla Soardi, also female poets of sixteenth-century Casale.

References

People from Casale Monferrato
Women writers (Renaissance)
17th-century Italian writers
17th-century Italian women writers
Year of birth missing
Year of death missing
17th-century Latin-language writers
New Latin-language poets
Latin-language writers from Italy